Huh Jung-moo (Korean: 허정무, Hanja: 許丁茂; born 13 January 1955) is a former South Korean football player and manager.

Playing career
Huh was one of the best South Korean college footballers before starting his semi-professional career. He was often compared with Korea University's Cha Bum-kun while playing for Yonsei University. After his graduation, he joined Korea Electric Power FC, and simultaneously enlisted in Marine Corps and Navy FC to do mandatory military service.

When Huh was discharged from the military service, European clubs were interested in Asian players due to Cha Bum-kun's performance in the Bundesliga. Motivated by Cha, Huh also wanted to play for a European club, joining Eredivisie side PSV Eindhoven in August 1980. He mainly played as a defensive midfielder and showed impressive form for three years. Johan Cruyff, who was tired from Huh's active marking, broke Huh's nose with his arm, and Willem van Hanegem showed a hysteria to Huh with the racist gesture "Slant-eye".

Huh went back to South Korea after the 1982–83 season. His wife felt homesick, and he also didn't feel the need to continue his life abroad after hearing the news that a professional league was founded in his country. Huh joined Hyundai Horang-i as a founding member in 1984, and played for it for three years.

Huh was on the South Korea national team from 1974 to 1986, and won two gold medals in the Asian Games. He was also a member of Korean squad in the 1986 FIFA World Cup. In a group match against Argentina, he left a famous photo that he appeared to be kicking Diego Maradona whose face twisted with pain. Afterwards, he scored a goal against Italy.

Style of play
Huh was a versatile player, and could play in multiple positions. He was capable of playing as a striker, winger, attacking midfielder, defensive midfielder, or full-back. He covered great distance by utilising his competitive spirit and stamina. Because of his tough and energetic playing style, he was nicknamed "Jindogae", the hunter dog breed originated from his hometown Jindo Island. He was also adept at man marking and often duelled with Johan Cruyff in De Topper. He didn't have rapid pace, but he could dribble the ball with intelligent movement.

Managerial career
Huh has previously coached the South Korea national football team twice before, as well as running the POSCO Atoms and the Jeonnam Dragons. His team won the Korean FA Cup three times.

His first term as the coach of the national team was temporary. In 1998, he was appointed for the first time as head coach. He picked some nameless young players and gave them important positions instead of established stars, inviting harsh criticism. After failures in the 2000 Summer Olympics and 1998 Asian Games, he was replaced by Guus Hiddink.

Since Hiddink's incredible success in the 2002 FIFA World Cup, Korea Football Association began hiring foreign managers, including Humberto Coelho, Jo Bonfrere, Dick Advocaat, and Pim Verbeek. They failed to match Hiddink's success. Meanwhile, the criticized "nameless players" picked by Huh became stars. Park Ji-sung, once the most unpopular player while Huh was coach, turned into the most successful player in Asia. Lee Young-pyo and Seol Ki-hyeon also rose to prominence. The success of Huh's former apprentices and him with Jeonnam Dragons made him revalued as a candidate for head coach. Huh was appointed for the second time in December 2007 after leading candidates Mick McCarthy and Gérard Houllier both rejected the job.

Huh got the team qualified for the 2010 FIFA World Cup without a loss in the qualification.
In November 2009, he won AFC Coach of the Year after leading the national team to 27 consecutive games without a loss. The team advanced to the second round of the 2010 FIFA World Cup.

Career statistics

Club

International
 

Results list South Korea's goal tally first.

Honours

Player
Yonsei University
Korean National Championship runner-up: 1974

ROK Navy
Korean President's Cup: 1979

Hyundai Horang-i
Korean League Cup: 1986

South Korea
Asian Games: 1978, 1986

Individual
Korean National Championship top goalscorer: 1974
Korean FA Best XI: 1974, 1977, 1978, 1979, 1984, 1985, 1986
Korean President's Cup Best Player: 1979
Korean FA Player of the Year: 1984
K League 1 Best XI: 1984

Manager
POSCO Atoms
Korean League Cup: 1993

Jeonnam Dragons
Korean FA Cup: 1997, 2006, 2007
Korean League Cup runner-up: 1997

South Korea
AFC Asian Cup third place: 2000
EAFF Championship: 2008

Individual
Korean FA Cup Best Manager: 2006, 2007
AFC Coach of the Year: 2009

References

External links
  
 Huh Jung-moo – National Team Stats at KFA 
  
 

1955 births
Living people
Association football midfielders
South Korean footballers
South Korean expatriate footballers
South Korea international footballers
South Korean football managers
PSV Eindhoven players
Ulsan Hyundai FC players
Eredivisie players
K League 1 players
Expatriate footballers in the Netherlands
South Korean expatriate sportspeople in the Netherlands
1984 AFC Asian Cup players
1986 FIFA World Cup players
2000 AFC Asian Cup managers
2010 FIFA World Cup managers
South Korea national football team managers
Pohang Steelers managers
Jeonnam Dragons managers
Incheon United FC managers
Sportspeople from South Jeolla Province
Yonsei University alumni
Asian Games medalists in football
Footballers at the 1978 Asian Games
Footballers at the 1986 Asian Games
Asian Games gold medalists for South Korea
Medalists at the 1978 Asian Games
Medalists at the 1986 Asian Games
Republic of Korea Marine Corps personnel
Heo clan of Yangcheon